Area code 941 is an area code in Florida. Introduced on March 3, 1996, it includes the counties of Manatee, Sarasota, and Charlotte, areas along the Sun Coast of southwestern Florida, USA. It is the area code for North Port-Bradenton-Sarasota, Florida Metropolitan Statistical Area. DeSoto County, Charlotte County, Hardee County, Polk County, Okeechobee County, Glades County, and Hendry County were part of this area code until 1999, when area code 863 was created, and Lee County and Collier County were part of 941 until March 2003 when area code 239 was created. Before the 941 area code, the region was originally 305, then area code 813.

Prior to October 2021, area code 941 had telephone numbers assigned for the central office code 988. In 2020, 988 was designated nationwide as a dialing code for the National Suicide Prevention Lifeline, which created a conflict for exchanges that permit seven-digit dialing. This area code was therefore scheduled to transition to ten-digit dialing by October 24, 2021.

See also
List of Florida area codes
List of NANP area codes
North American Numbering Plan

References

External links
 Florida's Area Code History (1947 - 1998)

941
941
Telecommunications-related introductions in 1996
1996 establishments in Florida
South Florida
Manatee County, Florida
Sarasota, Florida